Friona is a city in Parmer County, Texas, United States. The population was 4,123 at the 2010 census. Friona was established as a small community in 1898 by XIT Ranch, originally called Frio, which is also the word for "cold" in Spanish. The community served as a shipping point for the Pecos and Northern Texas Railroads. In 1906, The George G. Wright Land CO. chose the community for a colonization project, promising settlers of fertile soil, and a healthful climate. The community then became known as Friona after the opening of a post office in March 16, 1907 and started to construct various buildings, which were a hotel, livery stable and a bank. Soon after, the first church in Friona was constructed, and then in the following year of 1908 a school.

In 2007, the Texas State Legislature declared Friona the "Cheeseburger Capital of Texas". The city began holding the "Cheeseburger Cook-Off and Festival" in 2006. Aside from this annual event, only three fast-food locations sell cheeseburgers in Friona, which are: Tasty Cream, Dairy Queen, and Fast Stop.

The city motto is "The Biggest Small Town in Texas".

Geography

Friona is located at  (34.638987, –102.721571).

Demographics

2020 census

As of the 2020 United States census, there were 4,171 people, 1,409 households, and 1,084 families residing in the city.

2010 census
As of the 2010 United States Census,  4,123 people were living in the city. The racial makeup of the city was 69.9% Hispanic, 28.2% White, 0.9% Black, 0.3% Native American, 0.2% Asian, 0.2% Pacific Islander, and 0.3% from two or more races.

2000 census
As of the census of 2000, 3,854 people, 1,271 households, and 983 families resided in the city. The population density was 2,794.8 people per square mile (1,078.3/km). The 1,399 housing units averaged 1,014.5 per square mile (391.4/km). The racial makeup of the city was 61.47% White, 1.30% African American, 0.75% Native American, 0.39% Asian, 33.81% from other races, and 2.28% from two or more races. Hispanics or Latinos of any race were 57.86% of the population.

Of the 1,271 households, 44.4% had children under the age of 18 living with them, 64.4% were married couples living together, 10.0% had a female householder with no husband present, and 22.6% were not families. About 20.1% of all households were made up of individuals, and 10.6% had someone living alone who was 65 years of age or older. The average household size was 2.97 and the average family size was 3.48.

In the city, the population was distributed as 33.2% under the age of 18, 8.6% from 18 to 24, 26.8% from 25 to 44, 18.8% from 45 to 64, and 12.6% 65 years of age or older. The median age was 31 years. For every 100 females, there were 94.8 males. For every 100 females age 18 and over, there were 91.5 males.

The median income for a household in the city was $31,964, and for a family was $36,863. Males had a median income of $29,375 versus $19,299 for females. The per capita income for the city was $13,635. About 14.1% of families and 15.5% of the population were below the poverty line, including 17.5% of those under age 18 and 14.3% of those age 65 or over.

Education 
In 1954 after Brown v. Board Of Education, Friona was the first school in Texas to integrate black students.

The city is served by Friona Independent School District. The local high school mascot is a chieftain. The school colors are red and white.  The girls' team mascot is a squaw. The junior high boys' team mascot is a brave. The junior high girls' team mascot is a maiden.

Climate
According to the Köppen climate classification, Friona has a semiarid climate, BSk on climate maps.

References

Cities in Texas
Cities in Parmer County, Texas
Populated places established in 1906
1906 establishments in Texas